The Unique Alpine TPG-1 [where "TPG" stands for  ("Tactical Precision Rifle")] is a modular, multi-caliber, tactical applications precision sniper rifle made in Bavaria / Federal Republic of Germany.  This rifle is part of the equipment of the Hungarian police.

Users
: SEK Niedersachsen (Special Deployment Force)SEK Mecklenburg Vorpommern (Special Deployment Force)
: Hungarian police
 - Federal Ministry of Internal Affairs (FMUP)

References

External links
 Official website

Sniper rifles
Bolt-action rifles
Military equipment introduced in the 2000s